Sky on Fire is a 2016 Chinese action thriller film directed by Ringo Lam and starring Daniel Wu, Zhang Ruoyun, Zhang Jingchu, Joseph Chang and Amber Kuo. It was released in China by Tianjin Maoyan Media on November 25, 2016. It was Lam's final film before his death in 2018.

Plot
In this action thriller, the chief security officer at a top-secret medical facility (Daniel Wu) finds himself caught in an explosive battle when a young thief and his accomplices steal a groundbreaking curative medicine. After discovering the true origins of the medicine, the officer must decide who he can trust to prevent the cure from falling into the wrong hands, and prevent an all-out war from bringing the city to its knees.

Cast
Daniel Wu
Zhang Ruoyun
Zhang Jingchu
Joseph Chang
Amber Kuo
Fan Guang-yao
Wayne Lai
Philip Keung
Cheung Siu-fai
Ying Batu

Production
Daniel Wu hurt his nose during the filming of an action scene when it collided with Li Haitao's head. This led him to collapse after the impact. Li Haitao brought him a bag of ice and was able to re-adjust his nose.

Sky on Fire was in post-production by October 8, 2016.

Release
The film was picked up by for international release by the Hong Kong-based Distribution Workshop. The film was released in China on 25 November 2016.

Reception
The film has grossed  in China.

Edmund Lee of the South China Morning Post gave the film two stars out of five, noting that "the use of a futuristic setting that feels jarringly at odds with the touch of gritty realism prevalent in Lam's action thrillers" and that the film "made no sense" and was in "desperate need for a script doctor."

References

External links

Films directed by Ringo Lam
Chinese action films
2016 action films
Chinese suspense films
2010s Cantonese-language films
Tianjin Maoyan Media films
2010s Mandarin-language films